D'Ieteren SA is a company, based in Belgium that is engaged in automobile distribution and vehicle glass repair and replacement (VGRR).

Activities 
D'Ieteren is a group of services to the motorist, founded in 1805.

D'Ieteren Auto distributes Volkswagen, Audi, Škoda, Seat, Porsche, Bentley, Lamborghini, Bugatti and Yamaha vehicles across Belgium.

Belron (94.85% owned) performs vehicle glass repair and replacement. 2,400 branches and 8,600 mobile vans, trading under 15 different brands including Carglass, Autoglass and Safelite, serve customers in 35 countries.

History 

The D'Ieteren venture started in the 19th century, when it was founded by master coachbuilder Joseph-Jean D'Ieteren. The company started to manufacture car bodies at the beginning of the 20th century, with production being exported. Later, it moved into the assembly and importing of cars and trucks.

In 1948 a deal was struck by Peter D'Ieteren whereby the company would assemble Volkswagens under license.   Work began on a factory on the south side of Brussels in October of that year, and by 1949 cars were emerging from it.  There was also an agreement to assemble Studebakers, but most of the volume over the next couple of decades came from the Volkswagen business.   The factory was sold to Volkswagen in 1970 and is today known formally as "Audi Brussels".

D'Ieteren's car rental business commenced in 1956.

The company imports and distributes other makes of the Volkswagen group: Audi, SEAT, Skoda, Bentley, and Lamborghini, as well as Yamaha products.

D'Ieteren acquired Belron in 1999. Belron performs vehicle glass repair and replacement. The company operates in Europe and Brazil under the brand names Carglass and Autoglass (Ireland, United Kingdom, Poland), in North America (Canada, United States) as Safelite and Speedy Glass, in Australia under the brand name O'Brien and in New Zealand under the brand name Smith & Smith.

They acquired Moleskine in 2016.

References

Further reading
ROMMELAERE, Catherine, OLEFFE, Michel, KUPELIAN, Jacques & Yvette, D’Ieteren. 1805–2005. 200 ans d’histoire, Bruxelles, 2005, Ed. : Racine & sa D’Ieteren nv, Bruxelles

External links 

Companies based in Brussels
Automotive companies of Belgium
Companies in the BEL Mid Index
Henokiens companies
Belgian brands
Companies listed on Euronext Brussels